Musakaan ( Smile) is an Indian television series produced by Rashmi Sharma, under the banner of Rashmi Sharma Telefilms Pvt. Ltd., which premiered on 29 May 2018 on Star Bharat, replacing Jai Kanhaiya Lal Ki. It starred 
Sharad Malhotra and Yesha Rughani.

Plot
The story is about Aarti, a bar-dancer and her daughter Muskaan, who faces social ostracism because of Aarti's profession and yearns to stay with her. Muskaan studies in Darjeeling; Aarti is in Kolkata.

14 years later
Muskaan grows up to be timid and strong-minded, dedicated to her studies. She collides with Raunak Singh, and they fall in love and face many hurdles along the way. Some characters like his father Teerath try to separate them, but Raunak and Muskaan get married. Muskaan trains to become a police officer to give Teerath his utmost punishment, but gets soon abducted in another village. Later, Muskaan and Raunak have twin daughters, Khushi and Roshni. But, Muskaan is separated from Raunak as her car falls off a clifftop.

6 years later
Musakaan lives in Bangladesh hiding from the police, as falsely framed for a murder, and returns to find Raunak. She escapes from the police and bumps into Roshni which both of them are oblivious of. Raunak on the other hand takes care of Khushi, and marries another women named Nisha and raunak cousin marries another woman . At the end, Musakaan and Raunak get married again and they live happily ever after with Khushi and Roshni.

Cast

Main
 Yesha Rughani as Musakaan Bose Singh- Wife of Raunak Singh.Mother of Khushi and Roshni.
 Sonakshi Save as young Muskaan
 Sharad Malhotra as Raunak Singh- Husband of Musakaan.Father of Khushi,and Roshni.

Recurring
 Avyana Chhorwani as Khushi Singh, Raunak and Musakaan's one of twin daughters
 Maahi Soni as Roshni Raunak Singh, Raunak and Musakaan's one of twin daughters
 Sudesh Berry as Teerath Singh aka Sirji, Raunak's father owner of the brothel where Muskaan and her used to work. 
 Moonmoon Banerjee as Gayatri Teerath Singh, Raunak's mother
 Arina Dey as Aarti Farazi Bose, Musakaan's mother
 Devanshee Vyas as Damini "Dolly" Singh, Raunak's first sister
 Vandana Singh as Lovely Singh, Raunak's second sister
 Shital Antani as Sheetal Singh Bhatia, Raunak's fraternal aunt
 Tarun Khurana as Hanumant Yadav, Raunak's close friend
 Puneesh Sharma as Balbir "Bunty" Bhatia, Raunak's fraternal cousin
 Anamika Tiwari as Tabassum, owner of the brothel where Aarti worked
 Karam Rajpal as Sujoy Das, Musakaan's lover
 Richa Soni as Rakhi Das, Sujoy's mother
 Jyotsna Chandola as Sapna Das, Sujoy's sister
 Lavina Tandon as Suzzane Farazi, Musakaan's maternal aunt
 Aaditya Bajpayee as Rahul Patel, Raunak's colleague
 Tanu Khan as Kajal Bisht, Raunak's lover
 Rushad Rana as Balraj Bisht, Kajal's father
 Preeti Puri as Pramila Bisht, Kajal's mother
 Sangeeta Panwar as Kamlesh, Hukum and Malik's mother
 Shaurya Vardhan Sharma as Manohar Basu, a Police Inspector
 Aashish Kaul as Dinesh Sinha, a V.I.P. Guest
 Amit Kher as Mahesh Chaddha, Bar Head
 Sanarika as Kriti, a bar dancer
 Himanshi Jain / Preetika Chauhan as Jaya
 Shivam Singh Raghuvanshi as Mr.Raichand (Jaya's groom-to-be)
 Monisha Doley as Lomi
 Aishana Singh as Deepa
 Avinash Singh Chouhan as Bouncer
 Mahi Khan as Neha
 Deepraj Rana as Malik

References

External links 

 

Star Bharat original programming
2018 Indian television series debuts
2020 Indian television series endings
Indian drama television series
Prostitution in television
Works about prostitution in India